The Bison City Stakes is a Thoroughbred horse race run annually at Woodbine Racetrack in Toronto, Ontario, Canada. Held during first week of July, it is open to Canadian-foaled three-year-old fillies. Since the 1999  creation of the Canadian Triple Tiara, the race has been the second leg of the series. It is contested over a distance of  miles on Polytrack synthetic dirt, the race currently offers a purse of $191,725.

The Bison City Stakes was first run in 1954 at Fort Erie Race Track in Fort Erie, Ontario. Since inception it has been contested at two different distances and at two different venues:
  furlongs : 1954-1964 at Fort Erie
  miles : 1965-1976 at Fort Erie, 1977-1979 at Woodbine Racetrack, 1980-2006 at Fort Erie or Woodbine, 2007 to present at Woodbine

It was run in two divisions in 1956 and 1962. In 1991, Francine Villeneuve became the first female jockey to win the race. In 2003 there was a Dead heat for first.

Records
Speed  record: 
 1:42.15 - Awesome Rush (2005)

Most wins by an owner:
 7 - Sam-Son Farm (1972, 1984, 1985, 1987, 1991, 2000, 2003)

Most wins by a jockey:
 5 - Avelino Gomez (1959, 1964, 1965, 1967, 1972)
 5 - Patrick Husbands (2004, 2006, 2007, 2017, 2019)

Most wins by a trainer:
 5 - Mark E. Casse (2006, 2007, 2017, 2018, 2019)

Winners

References

 The 2008 Bison City Stakes at Thoroughbred Times

Restricted stakes races in Canada
Flat horse races for three-year-old fillies
Recurring sporting events established in 1954
Woodbine Racetrack
1954 establishments in Ontario
Summer events in Canada